In basketball, a three-point field goal (also known as a "three-pointer" or "3-pointer") is a field goal made from beyond the three-point line, a designated arc radiating from the basket. A successful attempt is worth three points, in contrast to the two points awarded for shots made inside the three-point line. The National Basketball Association's (NBA) three-point shooting leader is the player with the highest three-point field goal percentage in a given season. The statistic was first recognized in the 1979–80 season when the three-point line was first implemented that season. To qualify as a three-point shooting leader, the player must have at least 82 three-point field goals made. This has been the entry criteria since the 2013–14 season.

Craig Hodges, Steve Kerr, and Jason Kapono have led the league in three-point shooting for two seasons, while Kyle Korver has led the league in three-point shooting for four seasons. Kapono and Korver are the only players to do so in consecutive seasons.  Korver, who shot 53.6% from beyond the arc in the 2009–10 season, holds the all-time record for three-point field goal percentage in a season.

None of the leaders in this statistic have been inducted into the Naismith Memorial Basketball Hall of Fame.

Annual leaders

Notes

References
General

Specific

National Basketball Association lists
National Basketball Association statistical leaders